Hunting Creek Railroad Bridge is a historic stone railroad bridge located at Morganton, Burke County, North Carolina.  It was built about 1860, and is a two-span, stone arch bridge.  It measures 130 feet long and stands about 24 feet above the creek.  It was replaced by another bridge by at least 1890.

It was listed on the National Register of Historic Places in 1987.

References

Railroad bridges in North Carolina
Bridges completed in 1860
Buildings and structures in Burke County, North Carolina
National Register of Historic Places in Burke County, North Carolina
Railroad bridges on the National Register of Historic Places in North Carolina
Stone arch bridges in the United States